Profiteering may refer to:

 Profiteering (business) (during peacetime)
 War profiteering